Doreen Brennan is a former camogie player who in 1960 became the first player in camogie history to captain her side to victory in both the All Ireland Camogie Championship and Gael Linn Cup for inter-provincial teams in the same year. She won four All Ireland senior medals in 1957, 1958, 1959 and 1960.

Career
She starred in UCD's three Ashbourne Cup victories in a row of 1953 to 1955 and success in the Dublin camogie championship of 1955 and 1956, when she was captain. She was called up in 1957 for the Dublin team, who changed seven of their team after their shock 1956 semi-final defeat by Antrim. She retired from inter county camogie beforte the 1961 championship.

Golf
Former holder of the club record score in Delgany Co. Wicklow, Doreen is also an accomplished golfer, her lowest handicap being 4.

Family
Brennan was born in Davidstown, Co. Wexford into a family of 6 brothers and 3 sisters. Her sister Muriel Brennan was a renowned singer in her own right, once a lead with the Queensland Opera Company.

References

External links
 Camogie.ie Official Camogie Association Website

Dublin camogie players
Year of birth missing
Possibly living people
UCD camogie players